Andrzej Kądziołka (born 26 May 1965) is a Polish former ice hockey player. He played for Unia Oświęcim and Polonia Bytom during his career. He also played for the Polish national team at the 1988 and 1992 Winter Olympics, and multiple World Championships. With Polonia he won the Polish league championship six times.

References

External links
 

1965 births
Living people
Ice hockey players at the 1988 Winter Olympics
Ice hockey players at the 1992 Winter Olympics
Olympic ice hockey players of Poland
People from Oświęcim
Sportspeople from Lesser Poland Voivodeship
Podhale Nowy Targ players
Polish ice hockey defencemen
TH Unia Oświęcim players
TMH Polonia Bytom players